The Robert F. Kennedy Memorial is a memorial depicting Robert F. Kennedy by Anneta Duveen, installed outside the New York State Supreme Court building in Brooklyn's Columbus Park, in the U.S. state of New York. The memorial was cast in 1972, and dedicated on November 2 of that year. It features a bronze bust resting on a Kitledge gray granite pedestal and base; the granite was mined from New Hampshire, and the pedestal is inscribed with four quotes by Kennedy.

See also

 1972 in art

References

External links
 

1972 establishments in New York City
1972 sculptures
Bronze sculptures in Brooklyn
Busts in New York City
Cultural depictions of Robert F. Kennedy
Downtown Brooklyn
Memorials to Robert F. Kennedy
Monuments and memorials in Brooklyn
Outdoor sculptures in Brooklyn
Sculptures of men in New York City